Vasily Alexandrovich Kenel (1834–1893) was a Russian Empire architect.

Bibliography
He studied in the St Petersburg Academy of Arts, where Konstantin Thon was his teacher. In 1860 he was sent by the academy abroad as a pensioner for 4 years, where he worked at capturing images from nature and the figures found at the Pompeii ruins. For the foreign works he was honored with the title of academician. From 1875 Kenel was the architect of the Academy of Fine Arts for 15 years; during this time he erected several large buildings with workshops. At Saint Petersburg he built the Ciniselli Circus and many houses.

In the declining years of his life Kenel was the personal architect of Grand Duke Vladimir Alexandrovich of Russia, for whom he built many buildings and redesigned his palace in Saint Petersburg. He was made an Honorable free member (obshchnik) of the Academy of Fine Arts.

Architects from the Russian Empire
1834 births
1893 deaths
19th-century architects from the Russian Empire
Burials at Nikolskoe Cemetery